Ionuţ "Ion" Moldovan (born 17 January 1978) is a former professional tennis player from Romania.

He was Vice-President of the Romanian Tennis Federation from 2013 to 2015.

Career
Moldovan had his best results on the ATP Tour at the 1996 Open Romania, where he was a singles quarter-finalist and in 2005, when he made the semi-finals of the same event, this time in the doubles, with countryman Gabriel Moraru.

He played one Masters Series tournament, the 2000 Stuttgart Masters. In that tournament he partnered Andrei Pavel in the doubles and the pair were eliminated in the first round by Pablo Albano and Jaime Oncins.

The Romanian played five Davis Cup matches (three World Group matches) for his country, four in singles and one in doubles, all of which were lost.

He comes from a family of athletes. His father Ion is a former soccer player and head coach of Dinamo Bucharest. Valentina, his mother, is a former handball player for Hidrotehnica Constanta. He also has a sister Mihaela who was a tennis player, with a highest WTA ranking of 390. She played Fed Cup for Romania.

Challenger titles

Singles: (2)

Doubles: (7)

References

1978 births
Living people
Romanian male tennis players
Sportspeople from Constanța
Tennis players from Bucharest